= Petra Marathon =

Desert Marathon in the country of Jordan

- Date: September
- Location: Petra, Jordan
- Event type: Road, Gravel, Sand
- Distance: Marathon, Half marathon
- Established: 2009
- Organizer: Albatros Adventure Marathons
- Website: Petra Desert Marathon
- Participants: 245 (2022)

Petra Desert Marathon is a marathon and ultra half marathon (22.3 km) that took place for the first time on September 26, 2009. The race is run in and around the ancient city of Petra in Jordan.

Petra Desert Marathon is a part of the extreme marathon series hosted by Adventure Marathon.

== See also ==
- Adventure running
